Events in the year 1944 in Japan.

Incumbents
Emperor: Hirohito
Prime Minister:
Hideki Tōjō, until July 22
Kuniaki Koiso, from July 22

Governors
Aichi Prefecture: Shinji Yoshino
Akita Prefecture: Katsumi Osafune (until 7 January); Tadashi Hisayasuhiroshi (starting 1 August)
Aomori Prefecture: Utsunomiya Kohei (until 1 August); Hiroo Oshima (starting 1 August)
Ehime Prefecture: Aikawa Katsuroku (until 18 April); Chiyoji Kizawa (starting 18 April)
Fukui Prefecture: Hatsuo Kato 
Fukushima Prefecture: Koichi Kameyama (until 18 April); Ishii Masakazu (starting 18 April)
Gifu Prefecture: Miyoshi Shigeo (until 28 July); Masami Hashimoto (starting 28 July)
Gunma Prefecture: Shinoyama Chiyuki (until 25 February); Ishii Einosuke (starting 25 February)
Hiroshima Prefecture: Sukenari Yokoyama (until 1 August); Mitsuma Matsumura (starting 1 August)
Ibaraki Prefecture: Sieve Yoshimi (until 25 August); Hisashi Imai (starting 25 August)
Iwate Prefecture: Osamuzo Suzuki 
Kagawa Prefecture: Yoshiji Kosuga
Kochi Prefecture: Saburo Takahashi
Kumamoto Prefecture: Hikari Akira (until 1 August); Soga Kajimatsu (starting 1 August)
Kyoto Prefecture: Chiyoji Yukizawa (until April); Arai Zentaro (starting April)
Mie Prefecture: Yoshio Mochinaga
Miyagi Prefecture: Nobuya Uchida (until 25 February); Tsurukichi Maruyama (starting 1 August)
Miyazaki Prefecture: Tadao Nishihiro (until 1 August); Akira Taniguchi (starting 1 August)
Nagano Prefecture: Yoshio Koriyama (until 1 August); Yasuo Otsubo (starting 1 August)
Niigata Prefecture: Maeda Tamon
Oita Prefecture: Motoharu Nakamura 
Okinawa Prefecture: Osamu Mori Izumi
Saga Prefecture:  (until 1 August); Miyazaki Kenta (starting 1 August)
Saitama Prefecture: Sudo Tetsushin (until 1 August); Ryuichi Fukumoto (starting 1 August)
Shiname Prefecture: Takeo Yamada 
Tochigi Prefecture: Soma Toshio
Tokyo: Nisho Toshizo 
Toyama Prefecture: 
 until 25 February: Saka Shinya 
 25 February-25 July: Shoichi Nishimura
 starting 25 July: Shigero Okamoto
Yamagata Prefecture: Akira Saito

Events
January 31-February 3 - Battle of Kwajalein
February 17–23 - Battle of Eniwetok
April 17-May 25 - Battle of Central Henan
May–August - Battle of Changsha (1944)
June 4-September 7 - Battle of Mount Song
June 15-July 9 - Battle of Saipan
June 15/16 - Bombing of Yawata (June 1944)
June 19–20 - Battle of the Philippine Sea
June 22-August 8 - Defense of Hengyang
July 10-August 25 - Battle of Driniumor River
July 21-August 10 - Battle of Guam (1944)
July 24-August 1 - Battle of Tinian
August 16-November 24 - Battle of Guilin-Liuzhou
September 15-November 27 - Battle of Peleliu
September 17-October 22 - Battle of Angaur
October 10–20 - Formosa Air Battle
December 7 - 1944 Tōnankai earthquake
December 30–31 - Battle of Pearl Ridge

Births
February 8 – Isao Shibata, former professional baseball player
April 16 - Shoji Tabuchi
July 8 - Hironobu Takesaki
July 15 - Ken Kagaya, painter and writer (d. 2003)

Deaths
January 25 - Monzo Akiyama, admiral (b. 1891)
February 21 - Yoshimi Nishida, general (b. 1892)
March 29 - Kiichi Hasegawa, admiral  (b. 1894)
March 31 - Mineichi Koga, Marshal Admiral (b. 1885)
May 24 - Matsuji Ijuin, vice admiral (b. 1893)
July 6 - Chūichi Nagumo, admiral (b. 1887)
July 8 - Takeo Takagi, admiral (b. 1892)
July 10 - Yoshitsugu Saitō, lieutenant general (b. 1890)
July 19 - Shigeo Arai, freestyle swimmer (b. 1916)
July 28 - Takeshi Takashina, general (b. 1891)
August 1 - Kiyochi Ogata, colonel
August 2 
Kakuji Kakuta, captain (b. 1890)
Goichi Oya, admiral 
August 11 - Hideyoshi Obata, general (b. 1890)
October 15 - Masafumi Arima, admiral (b. 1895)
October 26 - Hiroyoshi Nishizawa, flying ace (b. 1920)
November 7 - Hotsumi Ozaki, journalist and soviet spy (b. 1901)
November 18 - Tsunesaburō Makiguchi, educator (b. 1871)
November 24 - Kunio Nakagawa, general (b. 1898)
December 1 - Murakami Namiroku, novelist and fiction writer (b. 1865)

See also
 List of Japanese films of the 1940s

References

 
1940s in Japan
Japan
Years of the 20th century in Japan